The tylas vanga (Tylas eduardi) is a species of bird in the family Vangidae. It is monotypic within the genus Tylas. It is endemic to Madagascar. Its natural habitats are subtropical or tropical dry forest and subtropical or tropical moist lowland forest.

References

tylas vanga
Endemic birds of Madagascar
tylas vanga
Taxonomy articles created by Polbot